Bus terminal may refer to:
 Bus terminus, where a bus starts or ends its scheduled route
 Bus station, where buses stop to pick up and drop off passengers